Wilmington Airport  (formerly known as New Castle Airport, New Castle County Airport, sometimes referred to as Wilmington-New Castle Airport, or to a lesser extent Wilmington/Philadelphia Regional Airport and Greater Wilmington Airport) is an airport located in incorporated New Castle County, Delaware, near Wilmington, Delaware. Owned by New Castle County and operated under a lease agreement with the Delaware River and Bay Authority, it is five miles (8 km) south of Wilmington and about 30 miles (50 km) from Philadelphia. It is included in the Federal Aviation Administration (FAA) National Plan of Integrated Airport Systems for 2017–2021, in which it is categorized as a non-hub primary commercial service facility.

Federal Aviation Administration records say the airport had 642 passenger boardings (enplanements) in calendar year 2011 and 1,064 passenger boardings in 2012. Thanks to the inauguration of service by Frontier Airlines, 2013 enplanements increased to 52,456, though Frontier ceased its Delaware service in 2015. Frontier resumed service to Wilmington in February 2021 but discontinued service again in June 2022. Avelo Airlines has since started service to Wilmington in February 2023.

History 
The airport opened before World War II, named the Wilmington Airport and the Greater Wilmington Airport. The facility was taken over by the United States Army Air Forces during the war. Under USAAF control, the airport became New Castle Army Air Base. Its mission was to facilitate the movement of aircraft to the British and other Allies. Members of the historic Women Air Service Pilots (WASP) served as test and ferry pilots and towed targets for student gunners. There is a statue today at the airport that honors the women of the WASP that served their country in the time of need.

After the war ended, control of the airport was returned to civil authorities. A joint-use agreement was made between the United States Air Force and New Castle County authorities for a portion of the airport being retained for an Air National Guard Base. Trans World Airlines (TWA) operated a large overhaul base for its overseas planes at the airport until 1957 when the airline moved it to the Kansas City Overhaul Base which became the basis for today's Kansas City International Airport.

Delaware's first airline flights were operated by TWA and American Airlines at Wilmington in late 1947.

By 1967, Eastern Airlines was operating Douglas DC-9 jet service into the airport with nonstops to New York Newark Airport, Philadelphia Airport, and Washington D.C. National Airport as well as direct flights to Atlanta and Charlotte.

Allegheny Airlines also served Wilmington. In 1968, AL had four daily departures using their F-27s nonstop to Philadelphia, Washington's National Airport, Atlantic City, and Trenton. In 1969, Allegheny no longer flew F-27s and changed the four departures to Convair 580 prop-jets with two to DCA, one to PHL, and one to ACY.

United Airlines, while on a campaign to serve all 50 states, began service to Wilmington in 1984 with one-stop jet flights to Chicago. Service continued through 1987.

Famed aviator, Charles Lindbergh made a trip from Atlantic City, New Jersey to Wilmington, Delaware on October 21st, 1927 as part of his triumphant tour of America after his solo trip across the Atlantic Ocean.

1990s to present 
During five periods since 1990, Delaware has been the only U.S. state without any scheduled commercial airline flights: from 1993 through 1998, again from 2000 to 2006, from April 2008 until June 30, 2013, between April 2015 and February 2021, and from June 2022 to January 2023.

USAir Express carrier Crown Airways provided scheduled service to Parkersburg, West Virginia, briefly beginning in 1992 before its sale to Mesa Airlines in 1994..

In the late 1990s, the county leased the debt-stricken airport to the bi-state Delaware River and Bay Authority (DRBA), operators of the Delaware Memorial Bridge, and Cape May-Lewes Ferry, on a thirty-year lease with the provision that the DRBA may seek up to two additional thirty-year leases. Since taking over operations, the DRBA invested heavily in the airport's infrastructure - upgrading many aging buildings, rehabilitating taxiways and runways, and building  numerous new hangars and commercial buildings on the property.

Shuttle America offered scheduled flights out of Wilmington from the airline's founding in November 1998 until February 2000. They flew to Hartford, Buffalo, and Norfolk with 50-seat de Havilland Canada DHC-8 Dash 8-300 turboprops. Shuttle America would eventually discontinue its independent operations and become a commuter affiliate of United Express and Delta Connection.

On June 29, 2006, a Delta Air Lines regional airline affiliate began flights from Atlanta's Hartsfield-Jackson Atlanta International Airport to Wilmington Airport in New Castle County, the first airline service in six years. Delta Connection carrier Atlantic Southeast Airlines flew 50-seat Canadair CRJ regional jets on two daily roundtrip flights. Delta Air Lines ended the Wilmington flights on September 6, 2007, leaving Delaware without any airline service.

On March 8, 2008, Skybus Airlines began Airbus A319 jet flights from Columbus, Ohio and Greensboro, North Carolina, to Wilmington. Skybus ceased all operations effective April 4, 2008, once again leaving Wilmington Airport without any airline service. As of August 4, 2010, Avis Rent a Car System, LLC, Budget Rent A Car System, Inc., and Cafe Bama were the only tenants in the Main Terminal.

On July 1, 2013, Frontier began their Airbus A320 jet service at Wilmington, initially with flights to Denver, Chicago-Midway Houston-Hobby, Orlando, and Tampa. On June 26, 2013, Frontier announced nonstop jet service to Fort Myers would begin November 16. In June 2015, Frontier Airlines announced that it was ending all service from Wilmington because it was not a profitable operation. Service had actually stopped in April 2015, but at that time, Frontier claimed it was just a seasonal suspension of service.

On January 24, 2020, it was announced that Frontier Airlines has decided to restart service out of Wilmington. The start date was delayed due to the COVID-19 pandemic. Frontier Airlines service between Wilmington and Orlando restarted on February 11, 2021, but ended on June 6, 2022.

On October 20, 2022, Avelo Airlines announced it would be opening a new base at Wilmington-New Castle Airport with the addition of 5 new nonstop destinations in Florida, which include Orlando, Fort Lauderdale, Fort Myers, Tampa and West Palm Beach. It was reported the agreement with Avelo and DRBA was for 5 years. All flights began operating out of ILG in February 2023.

The Delaware Air National Guard, located at the Wilmington Airport, is used by President Joe Biden when he travels home from Washington, D.C.

Facilities
The airport covers 1,250 acres (506 ha) at an elevation of 80 feet (24 m). It has three asphalt runways: 9/27 is 7,275 by 150 feet (2,217 x 46 m); 1/19 is 7,012 by 150 feet (2,137 x 46 m); 14/32 is 4,602 by 150 feet (1,403 x 46 m).

In the year ending November 30, 2019, the airport had 48,024 aircraft operations, average 131 per day: 82% general aviation, 11% military, 7% air taxi, and <1% airline. 219 aircraft were then based at the airport: 94 single-engine, 74 jet, 26 multi-engine, 20 military, and 5 helicopter.

ARFF is supported via Delaware Air National Guard Fire Department Station 33.

Airline and Destinations

Destinations map

See also 
 List of airports in Delaware

References

External links

 Official sites: FlyILG.com and NewCastleAirportILG.com
  at Delaware DOT website
 Fixed-base operators (FBOs): Hawker Beechcraft Services, Aero-Taxi, AeroWays, Dassault Aircraft Services, Atlantic Aviation
 Aerial image as of March 1992 from USGS The National Map
 
 
 

Airports in Delaware
Delaware River and Bay Authority facilities
Transportation buildings and structures in New Castle County, Delaware
Wilmington, Delaware